Omar Jasika was the defending champion but withdrew before the tournament began.

Stéphane Robert won the title after defeating Daniel Altmaier 6–1, 6–2 in the final.

Seeds

Draw

Finals

Top half

Bottom half

References
Main Draw
Qualifying Draw

Burnie International - Men's Singles
2018 Men's Singles